Greco-Buddhism, or Graeco-Buddhism, is the cultural syncretism between Hellenistic culture and Buddhism, which developed between the fourth century BC and the fifth century AD in Gandhara, in present-day north-western Pakistan and parts of north-east Afghanistan.

It was a cultural consequence of a long chain of interactions begun by Greek forays into India from the time of Alexander the Great. A few years after Alexander's death, the Easternmost fringes of the empire of his general Seleucus were lost in a war with the Mauryan Empire, under the reign of Chandragupta Maurya. The Mauryan Emperor Ashoka would convert to Buddhism and spread the religious philosophy throughout his domain, as recorded in the Edicts of Ashoka. This spread to the Greco-Bactrian kingdom, which itself seceded from the Seleucid empire. Within its borders, the Greek fondness for statuary produced the first statues of the Buddha, leading ultimately to the modern tradition. 

Following the collapse of the Mauryan Empire, Greco-Buddhism continued to flourish under the Greco-Bactrian Kingdom, Indo-Greek Kingdoms, and Kushan Empire. Mahayana Buddhism was spread from the Gangetic plains in India into Gandhara and then Central Asia during the Mauryan Era, where it became the most prevalent branch of Buddhism in Central Asia. Mahayana Buddhism was later transmitted through the Silk Road into the Han Dynasty during the Kushan era under the reign of Emperor Kanishka. Buddhist tradition details the monk, Majjhantika of Varanasi, was made responsible for spreading Buddhism in the region by Emperor Ashoka.

Historical outline

The introduction of Hellenistic Greece to central Asia started after the conquest of that region by Darius the Great and his Persian Achaemenid Empire. He and his successors also conquered the Anatolian peninsula (what would someday be Turkey), which at the time was inhabited by many Greek cultures. When they rebelled, those Greeks were often ethnically cleansed by being relocated to the far end of the Persian Empire, those central Asian provinces. When Alexander the Great conquered Achaemenid Empire and further regions of Central Asia in 334 BC, he thus encountered many Greeks already established in the easternmost stretches of its empire. He then ventured into Punjab (land of five rivers). Alexander crossed the Indus and Jhelum River when defeating Porus and appointing him as a satrap following the Battle of the Hydaspes. Alexander's army would mutiny and retreat along the Beas River when confronted by the Nanda Empire, thus wouldn't conquer Punjab entirely.

Thanks to relocation by the Persian empire, there was established Greek culture in the far east of Alexander's empire. He founded several cities in his new territories in the areas of the Amu Darya and Bactria, and Greek settlements further extended to the Khyber Pass, Gandhara (see Taxila), and the Punjab. Following Alexander's death on June 10, 323 BC, the Diadochi or "successors" founded their own kingdoms. General Seleucus set up the Seleucid Empire in Anatolia and Central Asia and extended as far as India.

The Mauryan Empire, founded by Chandragupta Maurya, would first conquer the Nanda Empire. Chandragupta would then defeat the Seleucid Empire during the Seleucid-Mauryan War. This resulted in the transfer of the Macedonian satraps in the Indus Valley and Gandhara to the Mauryan Empire. Furthermore, a marriage alliance was enacted which granted Seleucus's daughter as Chandragupta's wife for diplomatic relations. The conflict additionally led to the transfer of 500 war elephants to the Seleucid Empire from the Mauryan Empire, presumably as reparations for lives lost and damages sustained.

The Mauryan Emperor Ashoka established the largest Indian empire. Following the destructive Kalinga War, Ashoka converted to Buddhism. Abandoning an expansionist agenda, Ashoka would adopt humanitarian reformation in place. As ascribed in the Edicts of Ashoka, the Emperor spread Dharma as Buddhism throughout his empire. Ashoka claims to have converted many, including the Greek populations within his realm to Buddhism:

The decline and overthrow of the Mauryans by the Shunga Empire, and of the revolt of Bactria in the Seleucid Empire led to the formation of the Greco-Bactrian Kingdom (250–125 BC). To their north, the Greco-Bactrians were followed by the secession of the Indo-Greek Kingdom (180  BC – CE 10). Even when, centuries later, these Hellenized regions were conquered first by the Yuezhi, then by the Indo-Scythians and the Kushan Empire (1st–3rd centuries AD), Buddhism continued to thrive there.

Buddhism in India was a major religion for centuries until a major Hindu revival from around the 5th century, with remaining strongholds such as Bengal largely ended during the Islamic invasions of India.

Cultural interaction

The length of the Greek presence in Central Asia and northern India provided opportunities for interaction, not only on the artistic but also on the religious plane.

Alexander the Great in Bactria and India (331–325 BC)

When Alexander invaded Bactria and Gandhara, these areas may already have been under Sramanic influence, likely Buddhist and Jain. According to a legend preserved in the Pali Canon, two merchant brothers from Kamsabhoga in Bactria, Tapassu and Bhallika, visited Gautama Buddha and became his disciples. The legend states that they then returned home and spread the Buddha's teaching.

In 326 BC, Alexander conquered the Northern region of India. King Ambhi of Taxila, known as Taxiles, surrendered his city, a notable Buddhist center, to Alexander. Alexander fought an epic battle against King Porus of Pauravas in Punjab, the Battle of the Hydaspes in 326 BC.

Mauryan empire (322–183 BC)

The Indian emperor Chandragupta Maurya, founder of the Maurya Empire, reconquered around 322 BC the northwest Indian territory that had been lost to Alexander the Great. However, contacts were kept with his Greco-Iranian neighbors in the Seleucid Empire. Emperor Seleucus I Nicator came to a marital agreement as part of a peace treaty, and several Greeks, such as the historian Megasthenes, resided at the Mauryan court.

Chandragupta's grandson Ashoka embraced the Buddhist faith and became a great proselytizer in the line of the traditional Pali canon of Theravada Buddhism, insisting on non-violence to humans and animals (ahimsa), and general precepts regulating the life of laypeople.

According to the Edicts of Ashoka, set in stone, some of them written in Greek and some in Aramaic, the official language of the Achaemenids, he sent Buddhist emissaries to the Greek lands in Asia and as far as the Mediterranean. The edicts name each of the rulers of the Hellenistic period:

Ashoka also claims he converted to Buddhism Greek populations within his realm:

Finally, some of the emissaries of Ashoka, such as the famous Dharmaraksita, are described in Pali sources as leading Greek ("Yona") Buddhist monks active in Buddhist proselytism (the Mahavamsa, XII), founding the eponymous Dharmaguptaka school of Buddhism.

Greek presence in Bactria (325–125 BC)

Alexander had established in Bactria several cities (Ai-Khanoum, Bagram) and an administration that were to last more than two centuries under the Seleucid Empire and the Greco-Bactrian Kingdom, all the time in direct contact with Indian territory. The Greeks sent ambassadors to the court of the Maurya Empire, such as the historian Megasthenes under Chandragupta Maurya, and later Deimachus under his son Bindusara, who reported extensively on the civilization of the Indians. Megasthenes sent detailed reports on Indian religions, which were circulated and quoted throughout the Classical world for centuries:

The Greco-Bactrians maintained a strong Hellenistic culture at the door of India during the rule of the Maurya Empire in India, as exemplified by the archaeological site of Ai-Khanoum. When the Maurya Empire was toppled by the Shunga Empire around 180 BC, the Greco-Bactrians expanded into India, where they established the Indo-Greek Kingdom, under which Buddhism was able to flourish.

Indo-Greek Kingdom and Buddhism (180 BC – AD 10)

North of Bactria was the Indo-Greek Kingdom, centered approximately around Alexandria Eschate. They controlled various areas of the northern Indian territory until AD 10.

Buddhism prospered under the Indo-Greek kings, and it has been suggested that their invasion of India was intended to protect the Buddhist faith from the religious persecutions of the Shungas (185–73 BC), who had overthrown the Mauryans. Zarmanochegas was a śramana (possibly, but not necessarily a Buddhist) who, according to ancient historians such as Strabo, Cassius Dio and Nicolaus of Damascus traveled to Antioch and Athens while Augustus (died AD 14) was ruling the Roman Empire.

Coinage
The coins of the Indo-Greek king Menander I (reigned 160–135 BC), found from Afghanistan to central India, bear the inscription "Saviour King Menander" in Greek on the front. Several Indo-Greek kings after Menander, such as Zoilos I, Strato I, Heliokles II, Theophilos, Peukolaos, Menander II and Archebius display on their coins the title "Maharajasa Dharmika" (lit. "King of the Dharma") in Prakrit written in Kharoshthi.

Some of the coins of Menander I and Menander II incorporate the Buddhist symbol of the eight-spoked wheel, associated with the Greek symbols of victory, either the palm of victory, or the victory wreath handed over by the goddess Nike. According to the Milinda Pañha, at the end of his reign Menander I became a Buddhist arhat, a fact also echoed by Plutarch, who explains that his relics were shared and enshrined.

The ubiquitous symbol of the elephant in Indo-Greek coinage may also have been associated with Buddhism, as suggested by the parallel between coins of Antialcidas and Menander II, where the elephant in the coins of Antialcidas holds the same relationship to Zeus and Nike as the Buddhist wheel on the coins of Menander II. When the Zoroastrian Indo-Parthian Kingdom invaded North India in the 1st century AD, they adopted a large part of the symbolism of Indo-Greek coinage, but refrained from ever using the elephant, suggesting that its meaning was not merely geographical.

Finally, after the reign of Menander I, several Indo-Greek rulers, such as Amyntas Nikator, Nicias, Peukolaos, Hermaeus, Hippostratos and Menander II, depicted themselves or their Greek deities forming with the right hand a benediction gesture identical to the Buddhist vitarka mudra (thumb and index joined together, with other fingers extended), which in Buddhism signifies the transmission of Buddha's teaching.

Cities
According to Ptolemy, Greek cities were founded by the Greco-Bactrians in northern India. Menander established his capital in Sagala (modern Sialkot, Punjab, Pakistan) one of the centers of the blossoming Buddhist culture. A large Greek city built by Demetrius and rebuilt by Menander has been excavated at the archaeological site of Sirkap near Taxila, where Buddhist stupas were standing side-by-side with Hindu and Greek temples, indicating religious tolerance and syncretism.

Scriptures
Evidence of direct religious interaction between Greek and Buddhist thought during the period include the Milinda Pañha or "Questions of Menander", a Pali-language discourse in the Platonic style held between Menander I and the Buddhist monk Nagasena.

Several Buddhist dedications by Greeks in India are recorded, such as that of the Greek meridarch (civil governor of a province) named Theodorus, describing in Kharosthi how he enshrined relics of the Buddha. The inscriptions were found on a vase inside a stupa, dated to the reign of Menander or one of his successors in the 1st century BC. Finally, Buddhist tradition recognizes Menander as one of the great benefactors of the faith, together with Ashoka and Kanishka the Great.

Buddhist manuscripts in cursive Greek have been found in Afghanistan, praising various Buddhas and including mentions of the Mahayana figure of "Lokesvararaja Buddha". These manuscripts have been dated later than the 2nd century AD.

Kushan empire (1st–3rd century AD)

The Kushan Empire, one of the five tribes of the Yuezhi, settled in Bactria around 125 BC, displacing the Greco-Bactrians and invading the northern parts of Pakistan and India from around AD 1. By that time they had already been in contact with Greek culture and the Indo-Greek kingdoms for more than a century. They used the Greek script to write their language, as exemplified by their coins and their adoption of the Greek alphabet.

The Kushan King Kanishka, who honored Zoroastrian, Greek and Brahmanic deities as well as the Buddha and was famous for his religious syncretism, convened the Fourth Buddhist council around 100 in Kashmir in order to redact the Sarvastivadin canon. Some of Kanishka's coins bear the earliest representations of the Buddha on a coin (around 120), in Hellenistic style and with the word "Boddo" in Greek script.

Kanishka also had the original Gandhari Prakrit Mahāyāna sūtras translated into Sanskrit, "a turning point in the evolution of the Buddhist literary canon"

The Kanishka casket, dated to the first year of Kanishka's reign in 127, was signed by a Greek artist named Agesilas, who oversaw work at Kanishka's stupas (cetiya), confirming the direct involvement of Greeks with Buddhist realizations at such a late date.

Philosophical influences

Several Greek philosophers, including Pyrrho, Anaxarchus, and Onesicritus accompanied Alexander in his eastern campaigns. During the 18 months they were in India, they were able to interact with Indian philosophers who pursued asceticism, generally described as gymnosophists ("naked philosophers").

Pyrrhonism

Pyrrho returned to Greece and founded Pyrrhonism, considered by modern scholars as the first Western school of skepticism. The Greek biographer Diogenes Laërtius explained that Pyrrho's equanimity and detachment from the world were acquired in India.

Pyrrho was directly influenced by Buddhism in developing his philosophy, which is based on Pyrrho's interpretation of the Buddhist three marks of existence.

Cynicism
Another of these philosophers, Onesicritus, a Cynic, is said by Strabo to have learnt in India the following precepts: "That nothing that happens to a man is bad or good, opinions being merely dreams. ... That the best philosophy [is] that which liberates the mind from [both] pleasure and grief". Cynicism, particularly the Cynic Peregrinus Proteus was further influenced by the tales of the gymnosophists, particularly the examples set by Kalanos, Dandamis, and Zarmanochegas.

Cyrenaicism
The Cyrenaic philosopher Hegesias of Cyrene, from the city of Cyrene where Magas of Cyrene ruled, is thought by some to have been influenced by the teachings of Ashoka's Buddhist missionaries.

Artistic influences

Numerous works of Greco-Buddhist art display the intermixing of Greek and Buddhist influences in such creation centers as Gandhara. The subject matter of Gandharan art was definitely Buddhist, while most motifs were of Western Asiatic or Hellenistic origin.

Anthropomorphic representation of the Buddha

Although there is still some debate, the first anthropomorphic representations of the Buddha himself are often considered a result of the Greco-Buddhist interaction. Before this innovation, Buddhist art was "aniconic": the Buddha was only represented through his symbols (an empty throne, the Bodhi Tree, Buddha footprints, the Dharmachakra).

This reluctance towards anthropomorphic representations of the Buddha, and the sophisticated development of aniconic symbols to avoid it (even in narrative scenes where other human figures would appear), seem to be connected to one of the Buddha's sayings reported in the Digha Nikaya that discouraged representations of himself after the extinction of his body.

Probably not feeling bound by these restrictions, and because of "their cult of form, the Greeks were the first to attempt a sculptural representation of the Buddha". In many parts of the Ancient World, the Greeks did develop syncretic divinities, that could become a common religious focus for populations with different traditions: a well-known example is Serapis, introduced by Ptolemy I Soter in Egypt, who combined aspects of Greek and Egyptian Gods. In India as well, it was only natural for the Greeks to create a single common divinity by combining the image of a Greek god-king (Apollo, or possibly the deified founder of the Indo-Greek Kingdom, Demetrius I of Bactria), with the traditional physical characteristics of the Buddha.

Many of the stylistic elements in the representations of the Buddha point to Greek influence: himation, the contrapposto stance of the upright figures, such as the 1st–2nd century Gandhara standing Buddhas, the stylized curly hair and ushnisha apparently derived from the style of the Apollo Belvedere (330 BC) and the measured quality of the faces, all rendered with strong artistic realism. A large quantity of sculptures combining Buddhist and purely Hellenistic styles and iconography were excavated at the modern site of Hadda, Afghanistan. The curly hair of Buddha is described in the famous list of the physical characteristics of the Buddha in the Buddhist sutras. The hair with curls turning to the right is first described in the Pāli canon; we find the same description in the Dāsāṣṭasāhasrikā prajñāpāramitā.

Greek artists were most probably the authors of these early representations of the Buddha, in particular the standing statues, which display "a realistic treatment of the folds and on some even a hint of modelled volume that characterizes the best Greek work. This is Classical or Hellenistic Greek, not archaizing Greek transmitted by Persia or Bactria, nor distinctively Roman."

The Greek stylistic influence on the representation of the Buddha, through its idealistic realism, also permitted a very accessible, understandable and attractive visualization of the ultimate state of enlightenment described by Buddhism, allowing it to reach a wider audience:

During the following centuries, this anthropomorphic representation of the Buddha defined the canon of Buddhist art, but progressively evolved to incorporate more Indian and Asian elements.

Hellenized Buddhist pantheon

Several other Buddhist deities may have been influenced by Greek gods. For example, Heracles with a lion-skin, the protector deity of Demetrius I of Bactria, "served as an artistic model for Vajrapani, a protector of the Buddha". In Japan, this expression further translated into the wrath-filled and muscular Niō guardian gods of the Buddha, standing today at the entrance of many Buddhist temples.

According to Katsumi Tanabe, professor at Chūō University, Japan, besides Vajrapani, Greek influence also appears in several other gods of the Mahayana pantheon such as the Japanese Fūjin, inspired from the Greek divinity Boreas through the Greco-Buddhist Wardo, or the mother deity Hariti inspired by Tyche.

In addition, forms such as garland-bearing cherubs, vine scrolls, and such semihuman creatures as the centaur and triton, are part of the repertory of Hellenistic art introduced by Greco-Roman artists in the service of the Kushan court.

Exchanges

Proselytism in the East

Greek monks played a direct role in the upper hierarchy of Buddhism, and in its early dissemination. During the rule (165–135 BC) of the Greco-Bactrian King Menander I (Pali: "Milinda"),  Mahadharmaraksita (literally translated as 'Great Teacher/Preserver of the Dharma') was "a Greek (Pali: Yona, lit. Ionian) Buddhist head monk," according to the Mahavamsa (Chap. XXIX), who led 30,000 Buddhist monks from "the Greek city of Alasandra" (Alexandria of the Caucasus, around 150 km north of today's Kabul in Afghanistan), to Sri Lanka for the dedication of the Great Stupa in Anuradhapura. Dharmaraksita (Sanskrit), or Dhammarakkhita (Pali) (translation: Protected by the Dharma), was one of the missionaries sent by the Mauryan emperor Ashoka to proselytize the Buddhist faith. He is described as being a Greek (Pali: "Yona", lit. "Ionian") in the Mahavamsa, and his activities are indicative of the strength of the Hellenistic Greek involvement during the formative centuries of Buddhism. Indeed, Menander I was famously converted to Buddhism by Nagasena, who was a student of the Greek Buddhist monk Dharmaraksita. Menander is said to have reached enlightenment as an arhat under Nagasena's guidance and is recorded as a great patron of Buddhism. The dialogue of the Greek King Menander I (Pali "Milinda") with the monk Nagasena comprises the Pali Buddhist work known as the Milinda Panha.

Buddhist monks from the region of Gandhara, where Greco-Buddhism was most influential, later played a key role in the development and the transmission of Buddhist ideas in the direction of northern Asia. Greco-Buddhist Kushan monks such as Lokaksema travelled to the Chinese capital of Loyang, where they became the first translators of Buddhist scriptures into Chinese. Central Asian and East Asian Buddhist monks appear to have maintained strong exchanges until around the 10th century, as indicated by the Bezeklik Thousand Buddha Caves frescos from the Tarim Basin. In legend too Bodhidharma, the founder of Chán-Buddhism, which later became Zen, and the legendary originator of the physical training of the Shaolin monks that led to the creation of Shaolin Kung Fu, is described as a Buddhist monk from Central Asia in the first Chinese references to him (Yan Xuan-Zhi in 547). Throughout Buddhist art, Bodhidharma is depicted as a rather ill-tempered, profusely bearded and wide-eyed barbarian, and he is referred as "The Blue-Eyed Barbarian" in Chinese Chan texts. In 485, according to the 7th century Chinese historical treatise Liang Shu, five monks from Gandhara travelled to the country of Fusang ("The country of the extreme East" beyond the sea, probably eastern Japan), where they introduced Buddhism:

Two half-brothers from Gandhara, Asanga and Vasubandhu (4th century), created the Yogacara or "Mind-only" school of Mahayana Buddhism, which through one of its major texts, the Lankavatara Sutra, became a founding block of Mahayana, and particularly Zen, philosophy.

Greco-Buddhism in the West

Intense westward physical exchange at that time along the Silk Road is confirmed by the Roman craze for silk from the 1st century BC to the point that the Senate issued, in vain, several edicts to prohibit the wearing of silk, on economic and moral grounds. This is attested by at least three authors: Strabo (64/63 BC – ), Seneca the Younger ( – AD 65), and Pliny the Elder (AD 23–79). The aforementioned Strabo and Plutarch (–125) also wrote about Indo-Greek Buddhist king Menander, confirming that information about the Indo-Greek Buddhists was circulating throughout the Hellenistic world.

Zarmanochegas (Zarmarus) (Ζαρμανοχηγὰς) was a monk of the Sramana tradition (possibly, but not necessarily a Buddhist) who, according to ancient historians such as Strabo and Dio Cassius, met Nicholas of Damascus in Antioch while Augustus (died AD 14) was ruling the Roman Empire, and shortly thereafter proceeded to Athens where he burnt himself to death. His story and tomb in Athens were well-known over a century later. Plutarch (died AD 120) in his Life of Alexander, after discussing the self-immolation of Calanus of India (Kalanos) witnessed by Alexander writes: "The same thing was done long after by another Indian who came with Caesar to Athens, where they still show you 'the Indian's Monument,'" referring to Zarmanochegas' tomb in Roman Athens.

Another century later the Christian church father Clement of Alexandria (died 215) mentioned Buddha by name in his Stromata (Bk I, Ch XV): "The Indian gymnosophists are also in the number, and the other barbarian philosophers. And of these there are two classes, some of them called Sarmanæ and others Brahmins. And those of the Sarmanæ who are called "Hylobii" neither inhabit cities, nor have roofs over them, but are clothed in the bark of trees, feed on nuts, and drink water in their hands. Like those called Encratites in the present day, they know not marriage nor begetting of children. Some, too, of the Indians obey the precepts of Buddha (Βούττα) whom, on account of his extraordinary sanctity, they have raised to divine honours."

Indian gravestones from the Ptolemaic period have been found in Alexandria in Egypt. The presence of Buddhists in Alexandria at this time is important, since "It was later in this very place that some of the most active centers of Christianity were established". 

The pre-Christian monastic order of the Therapeutae is possibly a deformation of the Pāli word "Theravāda", a form of Buddhism, and the movement may have "almost entirely drawn (its) inspiration from the teaching and practices of Buddhist asceticism". They may even have been descendants of Asoka's emissaries to the West. While Philo of Alexandria's description of the doctrines and practices of the Therapeutae leaves great ambiguity about what religion they are associated with, analysis by religious scholar Ullrich R. Kleinhempel indicates that the most likely religion the Therapeutae practiced was Buddhism.

Buddhism and Christianity

Although the philosophical systems of Buddhism and Christianity have evolved in rather different ways, the moral precepts advocated by Buddhism from the time of Ashoka through his edicts do have some similarities with the Christian moral precepts developed more than two centuries later: respect for life, respect for the weak, rejection of violence, pardon to sinners, tolerance.

One theory is that these similarities may indicate the propagation of Buddhist ideals into the Western World, with the Greeks acting as intermediaries and religious syncretists.

The story of the birth of the Buddha was well known in the West, and possibly influenced the story of the birth of Jesus: Saint Jerome (4th century) mentions the birth of the Buddha, who he says "was born from the side of a virgin," and the influential early Christian church father Clement of Alexandria (died 215) mentioned Buddha (Βούττα) in his Stromata (Bk I, Ch XV). The legend of Christian saints Barlaam and Josaphat draws on the life of the Buddha.

Criticism of the concept 
Johanna Hanink has attributed the concept of Greco-Buddhism to a European scholarly inability to accept that natives could have developed "the pleasing proportions and elegant poses of sculptures from ancient Gandhara", citing Michael Falser and arguing that the entire notion of "Buddhist art with a Greek 'essence'" is a colonial imposition that originated during British rule in India.

See also

Gandharan Buddhism
Gandhāran Buddhist texts
Greco-Bactrian Kingdom
Greco-Buddhist Art
Greco-Buddhist monasticism
Indo-Greek Kingdom
Milinda Pañha
Nāgasena
Religions of the Indo-Greeks
Silk road transmission of Buddhism
Buddhism in Central Asia
Buddhas of Bamyan
Kushan Empire
Ancient Greece–Ancient India relations
Index of Buddhism-related articles

Notes

References
 Vassiliades, Demetrios Th. 2016. Greeks and Buddhism. Athens, Indo-Hellenic Society for Culture & Development ELINEPA.
 Alexander the Great: East-West Cultural Contacts from Greece to Japan. Tokyo: NHK Puromōshon and Tokyo National Museum, 2003.
Baums, Stefan. 2012. “Catalog and Revised Texts and Translations of Gandharan Reliquary Inscriptions.” In: David Jongeward, Elizabeth Errington, Richard Salomon and Stefan Baums, Gandharan Buddhist Reliquaries, p. 204, Seattle: Early Buddhist Manuscripts Project (Gandharan Studies, Volume 1).
Baums, Stefan, and Andrew Glass. 2002– . Catalog of Gāndhārī Texts, no. CKI 32 
 Jerry H. Bentley. Old World Encounters: Cross-cultural Contacts and Exchanges in Pre-modern Times. Oxford–NY: Oxford University Press, 1993. 
 John Boardman. The Diffusion of Classical Art in Antiquity. Princeton, NJ: Princeton University Press, 1994. 
 Shravasti Dhammika, trans. The Edicts of King Asoka: An English Rendering. Kandy, Sri Lanka: Buddhist Publication Society, 1993. 
 Richard Foltz. Religions of the Silk Road, 2nd edition, New York: Palgrave Macmillan, 2010 
 Georgios T. Halkias, “When the Greeks Converted the Buddha: Asymmetrical Transfers of Knowledge in Indo-Greek Cultures”, in Trade and Religions: Religious Formation, Transformation and Cross-Cultural Exchange between East and West, ed. Volker Rabens. Leiden: Brill, 2013, p. 65–115. 

 Robert Linssen. Living Zen. NY: Grove Press, 1958. 

 Thomas McEvilley. The Shape of Ancient Thought: Comparative Studies in Greek and Indian Philosophies. NY: Allworth Press and the School of Visual Arts, 2002. 
 William Woodthorpe Tarn. The Greeks in Bactria and India. Cambridge: Cambridge University Press, 1951, 
 Marian Wenzel. Echoes of Alexander the Great: Silk Route Portraits from Gandhara, foreword by the Dalai Lama. Eklisa Anstalt, 2000. 
 Paul Williams. Mahāyāna Buddhism: the Doctrinal Foundations. London–NY: Routledge, 1989.

External links

 UNESCO: Threatened Greco-Buddhist art (archived 29 March 2002)
 Alexander the Great: East-West Cultural contacts from Greece to Japan  (archived 6 March 2012)
 The Hellenistic age (archived 4 February 2014)
 The Kanishka Buddhist coins (archived 17 August 2009)
 Interim period: Mathura as the Vaishnava-Buddhist seat of culture and learning (archived 10 September 2006)

 
Ancient history of Afghanistan
Ancient history of Pakistan
Buddhist art
Buddhism in Afghanistan
Buddhism in India
Buddhism in Pakistan
Buddhism in the ancient Mediterranean
Buddhist culture
Foreign relations of ancient India
Indo-Greek religions and philosophy
Mahayana
Religious syncretism in Asia